Alnwick is a town in Northumberland, England.

Alnwick may also refer to:

Places
Alnwick District, a former district in Northumberland, England
Alnwick/Haldimand, Ontario, a township in Canada
Alnwick Parish, New Brunswick, Canada

Other uses
Alnwick (surname)

See also
Alnwick Castle
The Alnwick Garden
Battle of Alnwick (disambiguation)
Annick (disambiguation)
Anick, a village in Northumberland.